
Gmina Sztabin is a rural gmina (administrative district) in Augustów County, Podlaskie Voivodeship, in north-eastern Poland.

Villages
Gmina Sztabin contains the villages and settlements of Andrzejewo, Balinka, Brzozowe Grądy, Budziski, Chomaszewo, Cisów, Czarniewo, Czarny Las, Dębowo, Długie, Ewy, Fiedorowizna, Grzędy, Hruskie, Huta, Jagłowo, Jaminy, Janówek, Jasionowo Dębowskie, Jastrzębna Druga, Jastrzębna Pierwsza, Jaziewo, Kamień, Karoliny, Klonowo, Kolonie Jasionowo, Komaszówka, Kopiec, Kopytkowo, Krasnoborki, Krasnybór, Kryłatka, Kunicha, Lebiedzin, Lipowo, Łubianka, Mogilnice, Motułka, Ostrowie, Podcisówek, Polkowo, Rogowo, Ściokła, Sosnowo, Sztabin, Wilcze Bagno, Wilkownia, Wolne, Wrotki and Żmojdak.

Neighbouring gminas
Gmina Sztabin is bordered by the gminas of Augustów, Bargłów Kościelny, Dąbrowa Białostocka, Goniądz, Jaświły, Lipsk, Płaska and Suchowola.

References

Sztabin
Augustów County